Mattia Bellegrandi (born 10 January 1989), known professionally as Briga, is an Italian singer-songwriter and rapper.

Together with Patty Pravo, he participated at the Sanremo Music Festival 2019 with the song "Un po' come la vita".

Discography

Studio albums 
 Alcune sere (2012)
 Never Again (2015)
 Talento (2016)
 Che cosa ci siamo fatti (2018)

Compilations 
 Il rumore dei sogni - Collection (2019)

Extended plays 
 Anamnesi (2010)

References

External links

Italian male  singer-songwriters
21st-century Italian  male singers
Singers from Rome
1989 births
Living people